Revoltosa (English: Rebellious) is the second studio album by Spanish alternative rock band Bongo Botrako, produced by Amparo Sánchez and lead vocalist Uri Giné. It was released on November 12, 2012, in Spain, France, Germany, United Kingdom, Belgium, Netherlands, Luxembourg and Japan on Kasba Music.

Track listing

Personnel

Credits adapted from the liner notes of Revoltosa.

Bongo Botrako
 Uri Giné – vocals, production
 Nacho Pascual – guitar
 Xavi Vallverdú – keyboard
 David Garcia – bass
 Gorka Robert – drums, percussion
 Xavi Barrero – trumpet
 Oscar Gómez – sax

Additional musicians
 Benjammin – vocals (track 3)
 Anita Kuruba – vocals (track 7)
 Chiki Lora – vocals (track 7)
 Amparo Sánchez – vocals (tracks 8,12)
 Joan Garriga – vocals (track 13)
 Jordi Mestres – guitar, bass
 Gerard Casajús – percussion
 Jose Alberto Varona – trumpet

Production
 Amparo Sánchez – production
 Gerard Casajús – additional pre-production
 Kaki Arkarazo – engineering, mixing, mastering

Design
 Robertiko Ramos – design, illustration

References

2012 albums
Bongo Botrako albums